Romania–Transnistria relations are the bilateral relations between the Pridnestrovian Moldavian Republic (PMR; Transnistria), internationally recognized as part of Moldova, and Romania. Romania does not recognize the independence of Transnistria.

During the 1990s, several governments of Romania supported the idea of a unification with Moldova. Many of the proposals would not have included Transnistria. During the 1992 Transnistria War, Romania provided Moldova with military support against Transnistria. Additionally, the Romanian foreign ministry was engaged in diplomatic activities to end the hostilities. 

In 2010, the Romanian government agreed to participate in the NATO missile defence system. As a reaction, the Transnistrian government suggested a deployment of medium-range 9K720 Iskander missiles in Transnistria. Three years later, experts considered this scenario unlikely.

In 2016, the Press Service of the Foreign Ministry of Transnistria protested against the alleged recurring intrusion of Romanian airplanes into Transnistrian air space.

In 2017, journalists of several Romanian media like România liberă and Digi24 visited Tiraspol and interviewed the Transnistrian foreign minister.

Romania is Transnistria's third largest export partner.

In 2019, Transnistrian president Vadim Krasnoselsky said, that for him, "Ukraine, Russia and Moldova (are) more relevant than Romania".

In Transnistria, Romania is traditionally seen as an antagonist.

See also
 Moldova–Romania relations
 Transnistria conflict

References

Moldova–Romania relations
Transnistria
Romania